Roxana Blanco (born 6 November 1967) is a Uruguayan actress of film, theater, and television.

Biography
Roxana Blanco is the sister of playwright Sergio Blanco. She took acting and singing classes at the Multidisciplinary School of Dramatic Art, where she graduated in the early 1990s. Since then she has developed a prolific theater career, which has earned her the  three times.

At the same time, she has developed an important film and television career that has given her international recognition and multiple awards.

For her leading role in Alma Mater by Álvaro Buela, she won the best actress award at the Biarritz Film Festival (France) in 2005. She received this again in 2012 for her work in The Delay.

Blanco has participated in more than twenty plays, representing texts by prominent figures of world theater. In 2009, she starred opposite Alejandra Wolff, Jenny Galván, and Andrea Davidovics in the television series , based on the theatrical work she had previously starred in.

Theater
 Dream of Autumn by Jon Fosse
 Las novias de Travolta by Andrés Tulipano
  by José Sanchis Sinisterra
 Proof by David Auburn
 La Sangre by Sergi Belbel
 Three Tall Women by Edward Albee
 Agatha by Marguerite Duras
 Central Park West by Woody Allen
 Macbeth by William Shakespeare
 Frida by 
 Cyrano de Bergerac by Edmond Rostand
 Last of the Red Hot Lovers by Neil Simon
 Roberto Zucco by Bernard-Marie Koltès
 Querido lobo by Roger Vitrac
 Richard III by William Shakespeare
  by Nelson Rodrigues
 Doña Rosita the Spinster by Federico García Lorca
 The Trojan Women by Euripides
 Cabaret by John Kander and Fred Ebb
 Tango by Sławomir Mrożek

With the Comedia Nacional
 Oresteia by Aeschylus
 Terrorism by the Presnyakov brothers
 Molly Sweeney by Brian Friel
 La mitad de Dios by Gabriel Calderón
 El tiempo todo entero by Romina Paula
 The Visit by Friedrich Dürrenmatt

Film
  by 
 El sexo de las madres by Alejandra Marino
 The Delay by Rodrigo Plá
  by César Charlone
 Nochebuena by 
  by Esteban Schroeder
 Alma Mater by Álvaro Buela

Awards

International
 Biarritz Film Festival: Grand Prize for Female Performance (Alma Mater) and Best Actress (The Delay)
 Milan Film Festival: Special Jury Prize (Alma Mater)
 Havana Film Festival: Best Actress Award (Alma Mater)
 : Best Actress Award (Matar a todos)
 Syracuse International Festival: Special Mention (Matar a todos)
 Costa Rica Festival: Best Actress (The Delay)
 Catalonia Festival: Best Actress (The Delay)
 Toulouse Festival: Best Actress (El muerto y ser feliz)

National
 Florencio Award for performance (Menú de cuentos), Best Supporting Actress (Terrorism, Roberto Zucco), and Best Leading Actress (Agatha, La travesía)
 Parcum Prize awarded by the Mercosur Cultural Parliament to one of the ten outstanding personalities of Uruguayan culture
 Award of the Film Critics Association of Uruguay for Best Film Actress (The Delay)
  (Alma Mater)
 Fripesci Award for Film Performance and Best Film Actress (Alma Mater)
 Iris Award (Alma Mater and El lector por horas)
 Woman of the Year Award (Alma Mater, Matar a todos, The Delay)

References

External links
 

1967 births
Actresses from Montevideo
Living people
Uruguayan film actresses
Uruguayan stage actresses
Uruguayan television actresses